The 22301/22302 Howrah–New Jalpaiguri Vande Bharat Express is India's 7th Vande Bharat Express train, connecting West Bengal's capital Kolkata with Siliguri, the largest city in northern part of West Bengal.

Overview 

This train is being operated by Indian Railways, connecting Kolkata and Siliguri, West Bengal's two most important cities. The train service officially started from 1st January 2023 on New Year's day from Howrah. However the inaugural service ran on 30th December from Howrah. This is the first Vande Bharat train service in Eastern India.

Rakes 

It is the fifth 2nd Generation train of Vande Bharat Expresses and was designed and manufactured by the Integral Coach Factory (ICF) under the leadership of Sudhanshu Mani at Perambur, Chennai under the Make in India initiative.

Service 

Coach composition 
The 22301/22302 Howrah–New Jalpaiguri Vande Bharat Express currently has 14 AC Chair Car (highlighted in Aqua color) and 2 Executive Chair Cars (highlighted in Pink color) coaches.

Speed 
Vande Bharat Express is capable of reaching 160 kmph for commercial run and 180 Kmph for trial but it does not touch 160 kmph speed over this route. Sometimes people become confused because according to Indian Railways Permanent Way Manual (IRPWM) on Indian Railways website or Indian Railway Institute of Civil Engineering website, the BG (Broad Gauge) lines have been classified into six groups ‘A’ to ‘E’ on the basis of the future maximum permissible speeds but it may not be same as present speed.

The maximum permissible speed of the train and route is 130 kmph between Howrah and Khana which is about 108 km part via Dankuni of Howrah - New Delhi route  and speed is less in the rest part and the speed in rest part is same as maximum speed of the route which is 110 kmph over KAN-BDAG (Khana - Bonidanga) , presently unknown but 100 kmph in 2011 between Bonidanga (after Gumani - GMAN) and Malda Town (MLDT)  45 Km long part, 110 kmph between Malda Town and New Jalpaiguri which is a part of Guwahati – Malda Town route having 110 kmph sectional speed
 which will be increased to 130 kmph between Malda Town and New Jalpaiguri by March 2023

See also 
 New Jalpaiguri–Howrah Shatabdi Express
 Howrah–New Jalpaiguri line
 Howrah railway station

Notes

References 

Vande Bharat Express trains
Named passenger trains of India
Higher-speed rail
Express trains in India
 
Transport in Jalpaiguri
Transport in Howrah
Rail transport in West Bengal
Transport in Kolkata
Rail transport in Howrah
Trains from Howrah Junction railway station